Charlie Mensuel (or simply Charlie, "mensuel" being a French term for a monthly periodical) was a French monthly comics magazine. Its publication began in February 1969, and ceased in February 1986.

Tagged "The newspaper full of humour and comic strips", it also adopted the slogan, "The newspaper one reads on the couch while munching chocolate". Charlie was originally the French version of a contemporary Italian magazine, linus. Like its Italian counterpart, it took its name from one of the characters of the comic strip Peanuts, in that case Charlie Brown. The comics featured in Charlie included French originals as well as translations of American strips — Peanuts and others — and of Italian stories originally published in Linus.

History
Charlie was first published on 1 February 1969, founded by Delfeil de Ton (with Georges Bernier's Editions du Square); del Ton was its first editor-in-chief.

Several people succeeded to the position of editor-in-chief, most notably Georges Wolinski, from 1970 to 1981. The position had also been held by Willem and Mandryka.

In 1970, it gave its name to Charlie Hebdo (English: Charlie Weekly), successor to L'Hebdo Hara-Kiri, following the prohibition of that publication.

Charlie Mensuel ceased publication for the first time in September 1981, but was purchased by Éditions Dargaud and reappeared in April 1982. On 1 February 1986, the final issue was published and the magazine merged with Pilote magazine. A new magazine began publication on 1 March under the name Pilote et Charlie, but this lasted only until the magazine reverted to Pilote on 1 September 1988.

Notes and references
Charlie Mensuel publications by the year BD oubliées

External links
 La mémoire de Charlie Mensuel issue descriptions on BDoubliées 

1969 establishments in France
1986 disestablishments in France
Comics anthologies
Defunct magazines published in France
Comics magazines published in France
French-language magazines
Magazines established in 1969
Magazines disestablished in 1986
Monthly magazines published in France